Peter Foldgast (born 3 December 1979) is a Danish former professional football player. He is currently working as a forward coach at FC Roskilde.

Coaching career
On 14 May 2019, FC Roskilde manager Christian Lønstrup was suspended by the club for the rest of the season, after he accused his own players of match fixation. The following day, the club appointed Foldgast as the manager for the rest of the season, since he already was working for the club as forward coach.

References

External links
 Danish national team profile 
 Brøndby IF profile 
 Superliga statistics at DanskFodbold.com 
 

1979 births
Living people
Expatriate footballers in Germany
Danish men's footballers
Brøndby IF players
Rot-Weiss Essen players
Aarhus Gymnastikforening players
Danish Superliga players
2. Bundesliga players
Association football midfielders
Association football forwards
Brøndby IF non-playing staff
Footballers from Copenhagen